Hando is an island of the Southern Red Sea Region of Eritrea.

Hando may also refer to:

Hando (given name), a forename of Estonian origin 
 a fictional character in the 1992 film Romper Stomper
Arthur Hando (1891-1949), Australian rules footballer
Fred Hando (1888-1970), Welsh writer
Robert Hando (born 1944), Australian rules footballer
Tünde Handó (born 1962), Hungarian jurist and judge